Cold Springs is an unincorporated community in Sparta Township, Dearborn County, in the U.S. state of Indiana.

History
Cold Springs was a station and shipping point on the Baltimore & Ohio Railroad.

Geography

References

Unincorporated communities in Dearborn County, Indiana
Unincorporated communities in Indiana